Naemi may refer to:
Naemi Briese (1908-1980), Swedish actress
Dahi Al Naemi (b. 1978), Qatari footballer
Naemi, Iran, a village in South Khorasan Province